"Love Me Tomorrow" is a song written by Peter Cetera and David Foster for the group Chicago and recorded for their album Chicago 16 (1982), with Cetera singing lead vocals. The second single released from the album, it reached No. 22 on the U.S. Billboard Hot 100 chart and No. 8 on the adult contemporary chart. Songwriter Cetera, a member of the American Society of Composers, Authors and Publishers (ASCAP), won an ASCAP Pop Music Award for the song in the category, Most Performed Songs.

On the Canadian pop singles chart, "Love Me Tomorrow" reached only as high as No. 35.  However, on the Adult Contemporary chart it peaked at No. 2.

Reception
Cash Box called it "a very melodramatic piece that can’t fall to capture pop attention."  Billboard said that in this follow-up to "Hard to Say I'm Sorry" Chicago "reaches for more drama through punched-up guitar accents and a more impassioned vocal."

Versions
The version of "Love Me Tomorrow" featured on the original Chicago 16 album (also on early Greatest Hits albums featuring the tune) has a length of 5:06.  However, on the 2002 remastered edition of Chicago 16, two measures of music are excised from the string-heavy opening sequence for the song's instrumental bridge (essentially, the repetition of the first two measures of the sequence is eliminated), decreasing the length of the track to approximately 4:58.  However, subsequent re-releases of Chicago 16 have restored the full original versions of "Love Me Tomorrow" and "What You're Missing" (which had been replaced with its single version on the 2002 remaster).

The single version of the song clocks in at just under four minutes, cutting the extended instrumental outro.

Video
Chicago made a music video for the song. According to Cetera, the videos for "Love Me Tomorrow" and "Hard to Say I'm Sorry" were shot on the same day.

Charts

Personnel
 Peter Cetera – lead & backing vocals, bass, BGV arrangements, rhythm arrangements
 Bill Champlin – keyboards, guitar, backing vocals, BGV arrangements
 Robert Lamm – keyboards, backing vocals
 Lee Loughnane – trumpet, flugelhorn, piccolo trumpet
 James Pankow – trombone, horn arrangements
 Walter Parazaider – woodwinds
 Danny Seraphine – drums, rhythm arrangements

Additional Personnel
 David Foster – acoustic piano, electric piano
 David Paich – synthesizer
 Steve Porcaro – synthesizer programming
 Chris Pinnick – guitar
 Steve Lukather – guitar
 Michael Landau – guitar
 Gerard Vinci – violin

References

1982 songs
1982 singles
Chicago (band) songs
Songs written by David Foster
Songs written by Peter Cetera
Song recordings produced by David Foster
Full Moon Records singles
Warner Records singles